Pilisvörösvár ( or ) is a town in Pest County, Hungary.

Notable people

Károly Erős, football player
Laszlo Toth, Hungarian-Australian geologist & vandal
Solomon Breuer, German rabbi

Twin towns – sister cities

Pilisvörösvár is twinned with:
 Borsec, Romania
 Gerstetten, Germany
 Gröbenzell, Germany

References

External links

 in Hungarian, English and German
Street map 

Populated places in Pest County
Hungarian German communities